1717 Omani invasion of Bahrain was the invasion of Bahrain in 1717 by the Sultanate of Oman, bringing an end to the 115-year rule by the eroding Safavid dynasty. Following the Afghan invasion of Iran at the beginning of the 18th century which weakened the Safavids, the Omani forces were able to undermine Safavid rule in Bahrain and culminated in the victory for the Yaruba dynasty rulers of Oman.  

Bahraini theologian, Sheikh Yusuf Al Bahrani, provides his personal account of the invasion in his biographical dictionary of Shia scholars, Lu’lu’at al-Baḥrayn (The Pearl of Bahrain): 

However, when the Omanis later relinquished control it did not bring peace to Bahrain; the political weakness of Persia meant that the islands were soon invaded by Huwala, who Al Bahrani says 'ruined' Bahrain. Almost constant warfare between various Sunni naval powers, the Omanis and then the Persians under Nadir Shah and Karim Khan Zand laid waste to much of Bahrain, while the high taxes imposed by the Omanis drove out the pearl merchants and the pearl divers.  Danish German Arabist Carsten Niebuhr found in 1763 that Bahrain's 360 towns and villages had through warfare and economic distress been reduced to only 60.

From 1783 Bahrain was ruled by a succession of sheikhs from the House of Al-Khalifa.  They continue to rule Bahrain to this day.

See also 
 History of Bahrain

References 

Conflicts in 1717
Invasions of Bahrain
Omani invasion
Wars involving Oman
18th century in Oman
Wars involving Bahrain
18th century in Bahrain
Bahrain–Oman military relations
Battles involving Safavid Iran
1717 in Iran